Alessio Vita (born 16 March 1993) is an Italian professional footballer who plays for Cittadella.

Club career

Early career

A former Torino youth player, he represented the club's Primavera formation from 2010 to 2012. In 2012, he was sold to Monza in co-ownership, making 36 appearances and scoring seven goals in his first season in the professionals. After two excellent seasons played in Biancorosso under his mentor Antonino Asta, his contract was not redeemed by Torino. On 19 January 2015, Monza, suffering from financial difficulties, released Vita for free.

Sassuolo and loan to Vicenza 
On 20 January 2015 Vita was signed by Serie A club Sassuolo on a three-and-a-half year contract. He was immediately transferred to Serie B club Vicenza Calcio in a temporary deal for one-and-a-half seasons.

He selected the number 16 shirt for his new team. Vita made his debut on 24 January, against Trapani. He substituted Stefano Giacomelli in the second half.

In July 2016 the loan was renewed.

Cesena
On 30 June 2017, the last day of Cesena's financial year, Vita was sold to Cesena, with Alessandro Ahmetaj and Emanuele Grumo moved to Sassuolo.

Cittadella
On 4 July 2019, he signed with Cittadella.

International career
Vita was a player of Italy Lega Pro representative teams, which he played 3 out of 4 possible matches of 2012–13 Under 20 Regional Competition, including a brace against Slovenia.  Vita also played the friendly match against Oman.

Career statistics

Club

References

External links
 AIC profile (data by football.it) 
 

1993 births
Footballers from Rome
Living people
Italian footballers
Association football forwards
Torino F.C. players
A.C. Monza players
U.S. Sassuolo Calcio players
L.R. Vicenza players
A.C. Cesena players
FeralpiSalò players
A.S. Cittadella players
Serie B players
Serie C players